Trichoboscis crocosema is a moth in the family Lecithoceridae. It was described by Edward Meyrick in 1929. It is found in India's Andaman Islands.

The wingspan is 13–14 mm. The forewings are purple fuscous sprinkled with dark fuscous and slightly sprinkled with whitish, the stigmata forming small obscure cloudy blackish spots, the plical slightly before the first discal. There is an elongate suffused light ochreous-yellowish mark on the costa at four-fifths. The hindwings are grey, darker towards the apex.

References

Moths described in 1929
Lecithocerinae